Break of Dawn (formerly titled Milk & Honey) is the fourth studio album from Bay Area vocalist Goapele after a five-year-long hiatus.

Background 
The first single, "Milk & Honey," was leaked on the Internet July 10, 2009, while the video directed by David Telles went into rotation on August 4, 2009, and was shot with the Red One Camera. It offers a more suggestive and seductive vibe than what fans may be accustomed to from the singer. Goapele is known to incorporate messages of politics, love, romance, and struggle into her music. The second single, "Right Here," is a love song produced by Drumma Boy.

On August 28, 2011, Goapele released the third single, "Play," a sensual song produced by Dan Electric & Teddy Thunderbolt.

Recording
Break of Dawn was recorded at the Zoo in Downtown Oakland, California, home of Goapele’s Skylight Studios. This project will be another personal album with several love songs as well as up-tempo joints. Production-wise, tracks with  Kanye West, Drumma Boy (Young Jeezy, T.I., Ludacris, Plies, Yung Joc, Rick Ross, Gorilla Zoe, Twista, E-40, Rocko, Juvenile, Yo Gotti, Monica, Paul Wall, 8Ball & MJG, Lil Jon), Dan Electric, Mike Tiger, Bobby Ozuna (Raphael Saadiq, John Mayer, Erykah Badu), Malay (John Legend, Mary J. Blige), Jeff Bhasker (The Game, Kanye West, Ludacris, T.I), Kerry "Krucial" Brothers ( Alicia Keys, Mario, Keshia Cole, Nas) and other musicians were confirmed.

Concept
On this album Goapele revealed a more confident, open, and sensual side. She said that she was liberating herself a little more and claims while there was something very empowering about appearing in a T-shirt without make-up on the cover of her first internationally distributed album, Even Closer, there is something equally empowering about shedding her fears of music-industry exploitation and strutting confidently into more brazen territory. She said, “Now if I want to dress sexy, I can, and if I want to be more blunt, I can. I just want to do what feels good.”

Track listing
"Play"—3:43
"Tears On My Pillow"—4:46
"Undertow"—3:47
"Break of Dawn"—4:29
"Hush"—4:05
"Money"—4:06
"Pieces"—3:24
"Right Here"—3:21
"Milk & Honey"—3:12
"Cupcake" —3:40

References

External links
Official site
Goapele Press
Goapele at MySpace

Goapele albums
2011 albums